The D. C. S. Oosthuizen Memorial Lecture at Rhodes University, dedicated to the memory of the philosopher D. C. S. Oosthuizen, was founded in 1970 and is held annually.  The lectures are organised by the university's Academic Freedom Committee.

Lectures

1970 Alan Paton, Inaugural lecture
1971 Jean Sinclair
1978 Frederik van Zyl Slabbert, Some reflections on academic freedom
1979 Geoff Budlender, The university and the new foreigners. 
1980 G. R. Bozzoli, Change is Not Made Without Inconvenience
1982 Helen Joseph
1983 Nadine Gordimer, Living in the Interregnum
1984 Mark Orkin, Forced to be Free
1985 Allistair Sparks
1989 Jakes Gerwel		
1990 Frederik van Zyl Slabbert
1991 Albie Sachs, Black is beautiful, brown is beautiful, white is beautiful: towards a rainbow culture in a united South Africa 
1992 S. M. E. Bengu, The university and a free society
1993 Mahmood Mamdani, Universities in crisis : a reflection on the African experience
1994 Cheryl Carolus, Reconstruction and development is not a spectator sport: what is the role of our universities?
1995 Brenda Gourley
1996 Jairam Reddy, The university in contemporary society - the South African challenge	
1997 Itumaleng Mosala
1998 Dennis Davis, The new nationalism: is there a future for South African universities?
1999 Mamphela Ramphele, The responsibility side of the academic freedom debate	
2000 Malegapuru Makgoba, The university in a developing free society : challenges to autonomy and academic freedom
2001 Neville Alexander, Language Policy, Symbolic Power and the Democratic Responsibility of the Post-Apartheid University 
2002 Jonathan D. Jansen, Is Race / Ethnicity Back?
2003 (No lecture was held)
2004	The lecture was replaced by a symposium, with the following speakers:
André du Toit, The Legacy of Daantjie Oosthuizen:Revisiting the Liberal Defence of Academic Freedom
Andrew Nash, Dialogue Alone: D. C. S. Oosthuizen’s Engagement with Three Philosophical Generations
Charles Villa Vincencio, Thinking Outside the Hut 
Ian Macintosh, D. C. S. Oosthuizen's Legacy	
2005 Naledi Pandor, African Universities and the Challenges of a Developmental State	
2006 Chris Brink, Putting a price on academic ′freedom′ (This lecture was postponed and actually delivered in 2007)
2007 Ferial Haffajee
2008 Barney Pityana, On Academic Freedom
2009 Cheryl de la Rey, Academic Freedom – A Contested Good
2010 Mac Maharaj	
2011 Blade Nzimande, The role of universities in a transformed post-school education and training system
2012 (No lecture was held)	
2013 Silvia Federici, Academic Freedom and the Enclosure of Knowledge in the Global University
2014 Lis Lange, Thinking Academic Freedom
2015 Bruce Janz, "Free Space in the Academy"
2016 Eusebius McKaiser, Epistemic Injustices: The dark side of academic freedom
2017 Papama Nomboniso Gasa, Sexual and Gender Based Violence: Holding up a mirror to the South African society today
2018 Nomathamsanqa Tisani, Lost opportunities and pervading hope in South African Higher Education

Links
http://dcsoosthuizen.blogspot.co.uk/ (a memorial site to D. C. S. Oosthuizen) has further links to a number of the lectures

Lecture series
Rhodes University